Kenneth Orris Emery (1914–1998) was a Canadian-born American marine geologist.

Biography
Emery grew up in Texas and studied engineering at North Texas Agricultural College. He then studied geology at the University of Illinois, where he received in 1935 a B.S. and in 1939 an M.S. In 1937 he and another graduate student, Robert S. Dietz, moved with their mentor Francis Parker Shepard from the University of Illinois to the Scripps Institution of Oceanography in La Jolla, California. There Emery pursued doctoral research on the California continental margin. He received in 1941 his Ph.D. in geology from the University of Illinois. During WW II, he worked in San Diego and produced maps for the U.S. Navy of sediment types from oceanographic surveys. The maps were important for acoustic submarine warfare and scientific understanding of continental margins. At the end of WW II he moved to Los Angeles and joined the faculty of the University of Southern California (USC) as an assistant professor and was later promoted to full professor.

For the academic year 1958–1959 he was on a leave of absence as a Guggenheim Fellow.

His 1960 book, The Sea Off Southern California, A Modern Habitat of Petroleum is considered a classic. In 1962 he left USC and joined the marine geology group of Woods Hole Oceanographic Institution (WHOI). At WHOI he was a senior scientist from 1963 to 1975, the acting dean of the joint WHOI/MIT graduate program in 1968, and the Henry Bryant Bigelow Oceanographer from 1975 to 1979, retiring as scientist emeritus in 1979. He was the author or co-author of about 360 scientific publications, including 15 books.

Emery and his wife lived for many years at the head of Oyster Pond in Falmouth, Massachusetts. At his home there he maintained an orchard and apiary and produced his classic 1969 monograph A Coastal Pond Studied by Oceanographic Methods.

He is the namesake of the "Emery rod method" used in studies of the dynamics of sand dunes and coastal beaches.

His marriage of 42 years ended with the death of his wife in 1983. Upon his death he was survived by two daughters and a granddaughter.

Awards and honors
 1958 — Guggenheim Fellow
 1968 — Foreign member of Academia Sinica
 1969 — Francis P. Shepard Medal for Marine Geology, Society of Economic Paleontologists and Mineralogists
 1971 — Member of the National Academy of Sciences 
 1971 — Prince Albert I Medal
 1974 — Compass Distinguished Achievement Award, Marine Technical Society
 1977 — Foreign member of the Royal Swedish Academy of Sciences
 1985 — Maurice Ewing Medal
 1989 — William H. Twenhofel Medal

Selected publications

 (pbk reprint of 1984 original)
 (pbk reprint of 1994 original)

References

Caeegory:Canadian emigrants to the United States

1914 births
1998 deaths
20th-century American geologists
American oceanographers
Marine geologists
People from Swift Current
University of Illinois Urbana-Champaign alumni
University of Southern California faculty
Members of the United States National Academy of Sciences
Members of the Royal Swedish Academy of Sciences